Koknese Parish is an administrative unit of Aizkraukle Municipality in the Vidzeme region of Latvia.

Towns, villages and settlements of Koknese Parish 
Atradze 
Auliciems 
Bilstiņi
Birznieki 
Bormaņi 
Kalnakrogs
Kaplava 
Koknese 
Lipši 
Ratnicēni 
Reiņi 
Spriņģi 
Upeslīči 
Urgas 
Ūsiņi 
Viskāļi

Notable people 
 Pēteris Stučka

Parishes of Latvia
Aizkraukle Municipality
Vidzeme